"A Farmer's Ghost" is a popular English poem by the Indian poet and writer Anju Makhija. The poem won First Prize in the Fifth All India Poetry Competition conducted by The Poetry Society (India) in 1994. The poem has been widely cited and anthologised in reputed journals and scholarly volumes on contemporary Indian poetry.

Comments and criticism
The poem has received positive reviews since its first publication in 1995 in the anthology on Indian Poetry Emerging Voices. The poem has been frequently quoted in scholarly analysis of contemporary Indian English poetry. The poem is regarded by critics as a jewel in contemporary Indian poetry.

See also
The Poetry Society (India)

Notes

External links
  Fifth National Poetry Competition 1994 - Award Winners
  Anthology of Contemporary Indian Poetry - Anju Makhija
  India Writes - Contemporary Indian Poetry
"Best Indian Poems"

Indian poems
Indian English poems
1994 poems
Works originally published in Indian magazines
Works originally published in literary magazines